The Wilaya of Touggourt is an Algerian province created in 2019, previously, a delegated wilaya created in 2015. It is in the Algerian Sahara.

Geography 
The wilaya of Touggourt is in the Algerian Sahara; its area is 131,220 km²   .

It is delimited by:

 to the north by the El M'Ghair Province;
 to the east by the El Oued Province;
 to the west by the Ouargla Province;
 and to the south by the Ouargla Province.

History 
The wilaya of Touggourt was created on November 26, 2019 .

Previously, it was a delegated wilaya, created according to the law n° 15–140 of May 27, 2015, creating administrative districts in certain wilayas and fixing the specific rules related to them, as well as the list of municipalities that are attached to it. Before 2019, it was attached to the Ouargla Province.

Organization of the wilaya 
During the administrative breakdown of 2015, the delegated wilaya of Touggourt is made up of 4 districts and 11 communes.

List of walis

Notes and references

References 

 
Provinces of Algeria
Sahara
States and territories established in 2019